"Talk Like That" is a song by Australian electronic music duo the Presets, released as the third from their second studio album, Apocalypso (2008). The song was written by duo members Julian Hamilton and Kim Moyes and released in September 2008. Moyes has described the track as "a calypso house track with these weird cathedral organs, techno tom toms and a ballsy bassline."

Upon the song's release, the song debuted at number 49 on the Australian Singles Chart and peaked at number 19 in November 2008. The music video for "Talk Like That" was shot by French directorial duo Jonas & François.

Track listing
 "Talk Like That" (original) – 3:44
 "Talk Like That" (Dave Spoon Televised remix) – 7:44
 "Talk Like That" (Jence remix) – 5:30
 "Talk Like That" (music video) – 3:42

Charts

Weekly charts

Year-end chart

Certification

Media usage
 This song was used on the Seven Network show The World's Strictest Parents.
 This song was used in the 2009 Rock Eisteddfod Challenge.

References

External links
"Talk Like That" music video

2008 singles
2008 songs
ARIA Award-winning songs
The Presets songs